She Wore a Yellow Ribbon is a 1949 American Technicolor Western film directed by John Ford and starring John Wayne. It is the second film in Ford's "Cavalry Trilogy", along with Fort Apache (1948) and Rio Grande (1950). With a budget of $1.6 million, the film was one of the most expensive Westerns made up to that time. It was a major hit for RKO. The film is named after "She Wore a Yellow Ribbon", a song popular with the US military.

The film was shot on location in Monument Valley utilizing large areas of the Navajo reservation along the Arizona-Utah state border. Ford and cinematographer Winton C. Hoch based much of the film's imagery on the paintings and sculptures of Frederic Remington. Hoch won the Academy Award for Best Cinematography, Color in 1950. It was also nominated as 1950's Best Written American Western (which the Writers Guild of America awarded  to Yellow Sky).

Plot
On the verge of his retirement in 1876 at Fort Starke, a small Frontier Army post, aging cavalry veteran Nathan Cutting Brittles is given one last mission: to deal with a breakout by the Cheyenne and Arapaho from their reservation following the defeat of George Armstrong Custer at the Battle of the Little Big Horn, and prevent a new frontier war.

Brittles' task is complicated by a second order: to deliver his commanding officer's wife and niece, Abby Allshard and Olivia Dandridge, to an eastbound stage. His troop officers, 1st Lt. Flint Cohill and 2nd Lt. Ross Pennell, meanwhile, vie for the affections of Olivia while uneasily anticipating the retirement of their captain and mentor.

Assisting Capt. Brittles with his mission is his chief scout, Sgt. Tyree, a one-time Confederate captain of cavalry; his first sergeant, Quincannon; and Maj. Allshard, Brittles's long-time friend and commanding officer.

After apparently failing in both missions, Brittles returns with the troop to Fort Starke to retire. His lieutenants continue the mission in the field, joined by Brittles after "quitting the post and the Army". Unwilling to see more lives needlessly taken, Brittles takes it upon himself to try to make peace with his old friend Chief Pony That Walks. When that too fails, he devises a risky stratagem to avoid a bloody war by stampeding the renegades' horses out of their camp, forcing them to return to their reservation ... on foot, trailed at a discreet distance by Lt. Cohill's troop of cavalry.

Brittles is recalled to duty as Chief of Scouts with the rank of Lt. Colonel—a U.S. War Department order endorsed, he is pleased to see, by Gens. Phil Sheridan and William Tecumseh Sherman, and by President Ulysses S. Grant. Olivia and Lt. Cohill become engaged. The film ends with the troop of cavalry trotting down the road on patrol.

Cast

 John Wayne as Captain Nathan Brittles
 Joanne Dru as Olivia Dandridge
 John Agar as Lieutenant Flint Cohill
 Ben Johnson as Sergeant Tyree
 Harry Carey Jr. as Lieutenant Ross Pennell

 Victor McLaglen as Sergeant Quincannon
 Mildred Natwick as Mrs. Abby Allshard
 George O'Brien as Major Mack Allshard
 Arthur Shields as Dr. O'Laughlin
 Michael Dugan as Sergeant Hochbauer
 Chief John Big Tree as Pony-That-Walks
 Fred Graham as Sergeant Hench
 George Sky Eagle as Chief Sky Eagle
 Tom Tyler as Corporal Quayne
 Noble Johnson as Red Shirt

Director John Ford's older brother Francis appears in only one scene as Connolly, the barman. Ford kept Francis on wages "for eight weeks even through Francis could have completed his scenes in less than a week". Other uncredited cast members include: Irving Pichel as narrator (voice), Harry Woods as Karl Rynders, the sutler; Cliff Lyons as Trooper Cliff; Mickey Simpson as Wagner, the blacksmith; Fred Libby as Corporal Kumrein; and Rudy Bowman as Private Smith. Among Rynders' associates is veteran character actor Paul Fix (Harry Carey, Jr.'s father-in-law) in a small uncredited role.

Production

Casting
Director Ford initially was uncertain whom to cast in the lead role. However, he knew that he did not want John Wayne for the part—considering, among other factors, that Wayne would be playing a character over twenty years older than he was at the time. Reportedly, Wayne's 1948 performance in Red River changed Ford's mind, causing him to exclaim, "I didn't know the big son of a bitch could act!" Ford realized Wayne had grown considerably as an actor, and was now capable of playing the character he envisaged for this film. When shooting was completed, Ford presented Wayne with a cake with the message, "You're an actor now". The role also became one of Wayne's favorite performances. Wayne, himself, felt that his Academy Award nomination for Best Actor of 1949 should have been for She Wore a Yellow Ribbon instead of Sands of Iwo Jima.

Filming
The cast and crew lived in relatively primitive conditions in Monument Valley. Most slept in dirt-floor cabins that only had communal cold-water drum showers. The film was completed ahead of schedule and under budget.

Although the film's cinematographer, Winton Hoch, won an Academy Award for his work, filming was not a smooth creative process because of conflicts with Ford. Ironically one of the most iconic scenes from the film was created during a dispute. As a line of cavalry rode through the desert, a real thunderstorm grew on the horizon. Hoch began to pack up the cameras as the weather worsened only for Ford to order him to keep shooting. Hoch argued that there was not enough natural light for the scene and, more importantly, the cameras could become potential lightning rods if the storm swept over them. Ford ignored Hoch's complaints; completing the scene as the thunderstorm rolled in, soaking the cast and crew. Hoch later had filed a letter of complaint against Ford with the American Society of Cinematographers over the filming of this scene.

The story of Hoch's refusal to shoot in this thunderstorm has often been repeated, but actor Harry Carey, Jr., who was on the set, contests it. He says Ford had finished shooting for the day, but when the picturesque storm brewed he asked Hoch if they could shoot in the declining light. Hoch answered, "It's awfully dark, Jack. I'll shoot it. I just can't promise anything". Ford then instructed, "Winnie, open her up [the camera lens] and let's go for it. If it doesn't turn out, I'll take the rap". Winnie complied, saying, "Fair enough, Jack".

This was the second John Ford movie filmed in Technicolor. The first was Drums Along the Mohawk (1939).

Publicity
A theater poster featured the male lead wearing a yellow neckerchief with his uniform and a yellow banner (with proportions and shape evocative of a stylish ribbon) behind him, that also looped some 270 degrees around the female lead's shoulders.

1958 television pilot
A 1958 unsuccessful television pilot written by James Warner Bellah titled Command starred Everett Sloane as Captain Brittles and Ben Cooper as Lt Cohill.

References

External links

 
 
 
 
 

1949 films
1949 Western (genre) films
American Western (genre) films
Films based on short fiction
Films directed by John Ford
Films set in the 1870s
Films shot in Utah
Films whose cinematographer won the Best Cinematography Academy Award
RKO Pictures films
Western (genre) cavalry films
1940s English-language films
1940s American films
Films shot in Monument Valley